Below is an incomplete list of ships built at the Fore River Shipyard:

Production record

East Braintree Yard

Quincy Point Yard

Yard number 107-206

Significant ships

U.S. Navy warships
Numerous famous warships were built at the Fore River Shipyard.  A partial list is below.  The date in parentheses indicates the date the ship was commissioned by the U.S. Navy, and not the date of its launch.

Aircraft carriers
 1 of 2 s
  (1927) Battle of the Coral Sea
  (1940) Guadalcanal Campaign
 5 of 24 s
  (1943) Battle of the Philippine Sea - Philippines campaign (1944-45)
  (1943) Battle of the Philippine Sea - Philippines campaign (1944-45) - Battle of Okinawa
  (1943) Battle of the Philippine Sea - Philippines campaign (1944-45)
  (1944) Philippines campaign (1944-45) - Battle of Okinawa - Vietnam War
  (1946) Korean War

Battleships

  (1906)
  (1906)
  (1907)
  (1910)
  (1916) World War I - Attack on Pearl Harbor - Invasion of Normandy and invasions of Southern France and Okinawa
  (1942) Naval Battle of Casablanca - Philippines campaign (1944-45) - invasion of Okinawa

Cruisers

  (1908) World War I
  (1907) World War I
  (1924) Attack on Pearl Harbor
  (1923) Attack on Pearl Harbor
 1 of 6  heavy cruisers
  (1930) Doolittle Raid - Battle of Midway - Battle of the Santa Cruz Islands - Battle of Tassafaronga
 1 of 2  heavy cruisers
  (1933) Battle of the Coral Sea - Battle of Midway - Battle of the Eastern Solomons - Battle of the Santa Cruz Islands - Naval Battle of Guadalcanal - Battle of Surigao Strait - invasion of Okinawa
 2 of 7  heavy cruisers
  (1936) Battle of Savo Island
  (1937) Doolittle Raid - Battle of Midway - Battle of Savo Island
 2 of 8  light cruisers
  (1941) Naval Battle of Guadalcanal - Battle of the Philippine Sea - invasion of Okinawa
  (1941) Guadalcanal Campaign - Battle of the Santa Cruz Islands - Battle of the Philippine Sea - Philippines campaign (1944-45) - Battle of Okinawa
 6 of 27  light cruisers
  (1943) Battle of the Philippine Sea - Philippines campaign (1944-45) - Battle of Okinawa
  (1943) Battle of Okinawa
  (1944) Battle of Okinawa
  (1944) Battle of Okinawa - Vietnam War
  (1944) Vietnam War
  (1946) Korean War
 8 of 14  heavy cruisers
  (1942) Battle of the Philippine Sea - Philippines campaign (1944-45) - Battle of Okinawa
  (1942) Battle of the Philippine Sea - Philippines campaign (1944-45) - Vietnam War
  (1943) Battle of the Philippine Sea - Vietnam War
  (1943) Invasion of Normandy and invasion of Southern France

  (1944) Battle of Okinawa
  (1944) World War II - Korean War - Vietnam War
  (1944)
  (1945) Korean War
 4 of 4  heavy cruisers
  (1945)
  (1945)
  (1945) Korean War
  (1953)
 2 of 3  heavy cruisers
  (1946)
  (1949)

  (1961) Vietnam War

Destroyer Leaders
  (1954)
  (1954)

Guided Missile Frigates/Cruisers
  (1960)
  (1961)
  (1961)
  (1962)

Destroyers
 4 of 21 
  (1909)
  (1910)
  (1911)
  (1912)
 1 of 4 
  (1913)
 1 of 6 
  (1915)
 1 of 6 
  (1916)
 2 of 6 
  (1916)
  (1916)

 26 of 111 
  (1918) World War I - Guadalcanal campaign
  (1918) World War I
  (1918) World War I - Destroyers for Bases Agreement
  (1918) World War I - Guadalcanal campaign
  (1918) World War I - Guadalcanal campaign - Battle of the Philippine Sea - Battle of Okinawa
  (1918) World War I
  (1918) World War I - Guadalcanal campaign
  (1918) World War I
  (1918) World War I
  (1918) World War I
  (1918)
  (1918)
  (1918) World War I
  (1918)
  (1918)

  (1918)
  (1919) invasion of North Africa - Philippines campaign (1944-45)
  (1919) Destroyers for Bases Agreement
  (1919)
  (1919) Guadalcanal campaign - Philippines campaign (1944-45) - Battle of Okinawa
  (1919)
  (1919)
  (1919) Destroyers for Bases Agreement
  (1919) Destroyers for Bases Agreement
  (1919) Destroyers for Bases Agreement
  (1919) Destroyers for Bases Agreement
 10 of 156 
  (1919) Philippines campaign (1944-45)
  (1919) Destroyers for Bases Agreement
  (1919) Destroyers for Bases Agreement
  (1919) Destroyers for Bases Agreement
  (1919) World War II
  (1919) Destroyers for Bases Agreement
  (1919) Destroyers for Bases Agreement
  (1919) Destroyers for Bases Agreement
  (1919)
  (1919) Battle of Okinawa
 1 of 8 
  (1934) Attack on Pearl Harbor - Battle of the Coral Sea - Battle of the Eastern Solomons - Battle of the Philippine Sea
 4 of 8 
  (1935) Attack on Pearl Harbor - Battle of the Coral Sea - Battle of Midway
  (1935) World War II
  (1935) World War II
  (1936) Doolittle Raid - Battle of Midway - Guadalcanal campaign
 2 of 4 
  (1936) Guadalcanal campaign - Battle of the Philippine Sea - Philippines campaign (1944-45)
  (1937) Battle of Vella Gulf - Battle of the Philippine Sea
 7 of 30 
  (1939) invasions of Sicily, Italy and Southern France
  (1940) invasion of Italy
  (1941) World War II
  (1942) Battle of the Santa Cruz Islands - Naval Battle of Guadalcanal
  (1942) invasions of North Africa, Sicily and Southern France
  (1942) invasion of Sicily
  (1942) invasions of Sicily and Southern France
  (1942) invasions of Sicily and Southern France
 4 of 98 
  (1945) Korean War
  (1945) Korean War - Vietnam War
  (1946) Korean War - Vietnam War
  (1946)
  (1949) (only a conversion... ?)

Destroyer Escorts
 9 of 148 s
 3 of 22 s
 6 of 51 s
 See also: Bethlehem Hingham Shipyard

Submarines
 The first five Imperial Japanese Navy submarines, known as the Holland Type VII submarines, built (in relative secrecy) at Fore River in 1904. 
 The first Spanish submarine, Isaac Peral (A-0) (1916)

B class
 USS Viper (SS-10) (1907)
 USS Cuttlefish (SS-11) (1907)
 USS Tarantula (SS-12) (1907)

C class
 USS Octopus (SS-9) (1908)
 USS Stingray (SS-13) (1909)
 USS Tarpon (SS-14) (1909)
 USS Bonita (SS-15) (1909)
 USS Snapper (SS-16) (1910)

D class
USS Narwhal (SS-17) (1909)
USS Grayling (SS-18) (1909)
USS Salmon (SS-19) (1910)

E class
USS Skipjack (SS-24) (1912)
USS Sturgeon (SS-25) (1912)

K class
USS Haddock (SS-32) (1914)
USS Cachalot (SS-33) (1914)
USS K-5 (SS-36) (1914)
USS K-6 (SS-37) (1914)

L class
USS L-1 (SS-40) (1916)
USS L-2 (SS-41) (1916)
USS L-3 (SS-42) (1916)
USS L-4 (SS-43) (1916)
USS L-9 (SS-49) (1916)
USS L-10 (SS-50) (1916)
USS L-11 (SS-51) (1916)

M class
 USS M-1 (SS-47) (1918)

O class

 USS O-3 (SS-64) (1917)
 USS O-4 (SS-65) (1917)
 USS O-5 (SS-66) (1917)
 USS O-6 (SS-67) (1917)
 USS O-7 (SS-68) (1917)
 USS O-8 (SS-69) (1917)
 USS O-9 (SS-70) (1918)
 USS O-10 (SS-71) (1918)

R class

 USS R-1 (SS-78) (1918)
 USS R-2 (SS-79) (1918)
 USS R-3 (SS-80) (1918)
 USS R-4 (SS-81) (1918)
 USS R-5 (SS-82) (1918)
 USS R-6 (SS-83) (1919)
 USS R-7 (SS-84) (1919)
 USS R-8 (SS-85) (1919)
 USS R-9 (SS-86) (1919)
 USS R-10 (SS-87) (1919)
 USS R-11 (SS-88) (1919)
 USS R-12 (SS-89) (1919)
 USS R-13 (SS-90) (1919)
 USS R-14 (SS-91) (1919)

S class

 USS S-1 (SS-105) (1918)
 USS S-18 (SS-123) (1918) 8 World War II Pacific patrols
 USS S-19 (SS-124) (1920)
 USS S-20 (SS-125) (1920)
 USS S-21 (SS-126) (1920)
 USS S-22 (SS-127) (1920)
 USS S-23 (SS-128) (1920) 7 World War II Pacific patrols
 USS S-24 (SS-129) (1922)
 USS S-25 (SS-130) (1922)
 USS S-26 (SS-131) (1922)
 USS S-27 (SS-132) (1922) 1 World War II Pacific patrol
 USS S-28 (SS-133) (1922) sank 1 ship in 7 World War II Pacific patrols
 USS S-29 (SS-134) (1922)
 USS S-42 (SS-153) (1923) sank 1 ship in 6 World War II Pacific patrols
 USS S-43 (SS-154) (1923) 3 World War II Pacific patrols
 USS S-44 (SS-155) (1923) sank 3 ships in 5 World War II Pacific patrols
 USS S-45 (SS-156) (1923) 4 World War II Pacific patrols
 USS S-46 (SS-157) (1923) 5 World War II Pacific patrols
 USS S-47 (SS-158) (1924) 7 World War II Pacific patrols

T class
 USS T-1 (SS-52) (1920)
 USS T-2 (SS-60) (1922)
 USS T-3 (SS-61) (1920)

Sturgeon class
 USS Whale (SSN-638) (1968)
 USS Sunfish (SSN-649) (1969)

Tank Landing Ships
LSTs 361-382 and 1004-1027 (46 total)

Oilers
  (1954)

Submarine tenders

L. Y. Spear class
  (1970) Named after Electric Boat Company executive, Lawrence York Spear. This ship was launched on 7 September 1967, commissioned in 1970 and decommissioned in 1996.
  (1971)

Commercial ships

Passenger ships 

 SS Borinquen (1931) New York & Porto Rico Line, Caribbean liner
SS Mariposa (1932) Matson Line, Hawaiian transPacific liner
 SS Monterey (1932) Matson Line, Hawaiian transPacific liner
 SS Lurline (1933) Matson Line, Hawaiian transPacific liner
 SS Independence (1951) American Export Line, transatlantic liner
 SS Constitution (1951) American Export Line, transatlantic liner

Other ships
 Thomas W. Lawson, a seven-masted, steel-hull schooner, the only ship of her kind ever built.
 William L. Douglas, a six-masted, steel-hull collier
 Sankaty, a propeller-driven steamer that served as a ferry to Martha's Vineyard and Nantucket and as a Canadian minelayer during World War II.
 SS Manhattan (1962) - Largest oil tanker in the world when built.  Converted to an icebreaker and successfully navigated the Northwest Passage in 1969.
 2nd Lieutenant John P. Bobo class of strategic sealift ships

See also
 List of United States Navy ships

References

Sources

External links

Fore River Shipyard
Fore River Shipyard